The 1980 BMW M1 Procar Championship was the second and final season of the BMW M1 Procar Championship. The series once again supported Formula One at various European rounds but also branched out to hosting its own standalone events.

Teams and drivers

Calendar and results

Championship standings

Points system

Standings

References

BMW Procar